is a private university in Kawagoe, Saitama, Japan, established in 2000. The predecessor of the school was founded in 1926.

Alumni
Mai Hoshimura, musician
Raiden, South Korean DJ

External links
 Official website 

Educational institutions established in 2000
Private universities and colleges in Japan
Universities and colleges in Saitama Prefecture
2000 establishments in Japan